Anawalt Lake Wildlife Management Area is a  protected area located in McDowell County, West Virginia. It is managed by the Wildlife Resources Section of the West Virginia Division of Natural Resources.

The terrain at Anawalt lake is steep, and covered with a second-growth hardwood forest.  A mixed oak-hickory forest habitat dominates the drier slopes, with yellow poplar and black cherry in the moister coves.

From Welch, follow West Virginia Route 103 to West Virginia Route 161, then to County Route 84 to Anawalt. Follow County Route 8 from Anawalt to Anawalt Lake WMA.

Hunting and Fishing

Hunting opportunities include bear, grouse, deer, squirrel, and turkey.  Fishing opportunities in  Anawalt Lake include stocked trout, largemouth bass, bluegill and channel.  The lake is accessible for the handicapped.  Boating and live minnows bait is prohibited.

See also

Animal conservation
Bear bag
List of West Virginia wildlife management areas
Recreational fishing

References

External links

West Virginia Division of Natural Resources web site
West Virginia Hunting Regulations
West Virginia Fishing Regulations

Protected areas of McDowell County, West Virginia
Wildlife management areas of West Virginia
IUCN Category V